Asobi may refer to:

Asobi, a pet-like robot in the video game The Playroom
Asobi, a 1971 film by Yasuzo Masumura
Asobi, a mini-album by Tomohisa Yamashita
Asobi (song), a 2014 song by Gesu no Kiwami Otome